Haplochromis bartoni was a species of cichlid endemic to Lake Victoria.  This species can reach a length of  SL. It has not been recorded in recent surveys but as the whole of Lake Victoria has not ben surveyed for this species the IUCN classify it as Data Deficient. This species was said by Greenwood to bear some resemblance to Haplochromis worthingtoni so he named this species after E. Barton Worthington (1905-2001) as well.

References

bartoni
Fish described in 1962
Fish of Lake Victoria
Taxa named by Humphry Greenwood
Taxonomy articles created by Polbot